Peter Martin (born 1934) is an English actor. He played Joe Carroll in The Royle Family (1998—2012) and Len Reynolds in Emmerdale (2001—2007). As well as this, he has appeared in many other productions on both screen and stage.

Career
He became known in the 1980s for his appearances in TV ads for the Jewson hardware chain.
His acting works includes playing the fish shop man in First of the Summer Wine. He also played 'Charlie the moonlighting gravedigger' in the Beiderbecke Tapes. He was in The Royle Family as Joe Carroll,. He also starred in the film Brassed Off, the television series All Creatures Great and Small, Chucklevision, Coronation Street, Playing the Field, Victoria Wood and Last of the Summer Wine.

In 2001, Martin began playing Len Reynolds in the ITV soap opera Emmerdale. In May 2007, it was announced that Martin's character Len, would be killed off, as Martin had accepted the role of Captain Mainwaring in a stage production of Dad's Army. In 2018, Martin had a role in the comedy film Walk like a Panther.

Filmography

Film

References

External links

Peter Martin (Aveleyman)

Living people
1934 births
People from Gainsborough, Lincolnshire
Actors from Lincolnshire
People from Accrington
Actors from Lancashire